Carbene C−H insertion in organic chemistry concerns the insertion reaction of a carbene into a carbon–hydrogen bond. This organic reaction is of some importance in the synthesis of new organic compounds. 

Simple carbenes such as the methylene radical and dichlorocarbene are not regioselective towards insertion. When the carbene is stabilized by a metal the selectivity increases. The compound dirhodium tetraacetate is found to be especially effective. In a typical reaction ethyl diazoacetate (a well-known carbene precursor) and dirhodium tetraacetate react with hexane; the insertion into a C−H bond occurs 1% on one of the methyl groups, 63% on the alpha-methylene unit and 33% on the beta-methylene unit.

The first such reaction was reported in 1981, and the general reaction mechanism proposed by Doyle in 1993. the metal that stabilizes the carbene, dissociates at the same time but not to the same degree as carbon–carbon bond formation and hydrogen atom migration. The reaction is distinct from a metal catalyzed C−H activation reaction where the metal actually inserts itself between carbon and hydrogen.

The metal employed as a catalyst in this reaction historically was copper until superseded by  rhodium. Other metals stabilize the carbene too much (e.g. molybdenum as in Fischer carbenes) or result in carbenes too reactive (e.g. gold, silver). Many dirhodium carboxylates and carboxamidates exist, including chiral ones. An effective chiral dirhodium catalyst is Rh2(MPPIM)4 with MPPIM (Methyl PhenylPropyl IMidazolidinecarboxylato) asymmetric ligand.

Most successful reactions are intramolecular within geometrically rigid systems, as pioneered by Wenkert (1982)   and Taber (1982).

References

Organic reactions
Carbenes